Joseph-Louis-Euclide Dugas (August 30, 1861 – December 27, 1943) was a farmer and political figure in Quebec. He represented Montcalm in the House of Commons of Canada from 1891 to 1900 as a Conservative member.

He was born in Montcalm, Canada East, the son of Firmin Dugas, and was educated at the Collège de Joliette and the Collège d'Ottawa. Dugas also served as a school commissioner. In 1883, he married Lizzie Rowan. Dugas' election in 1891 was overturned after an appeal but he won the by-election which followed in 1892. He was reelected in 1896 but was defeated by François Octave Dugas when he ran for reelection in 1900.

Electoral record

References 
 
 The Canadian parliamentary companion, 1891, AJ Gemmill

1861 births
1943 deaths
Members of the House of Commons of Canada from Quebec
Conservative Party of Canada (1867–1942) MPs